The Ninety-Second Arkansas General Assembly is the legislative body of the state of Arkansas in 2019 and 2020. In this General Assembly, the Arkansas Senate and Arkansas House of Representatives were both controlled by the Republicans. In the Senate, 26 senators were Republicans and 9 were Democrats. In the House, 76 representatives were Republicans, 24 were Democrats. A special session was called in March 2020 to address the COVID-19 pandemic.

Sessions
The Regular Session of the 92nd General Assembly opened on January 14, 2019. It adjourned sine die on April 24, 2019.
Governor Asa Hutchinson called for a special session to begin March 26, 2020 to address the COVID-19 pandemic. Due to social distancing recommendations, the 35 senators met in the 100-seat House chamber, and the House met in the Jack Stephens Center basketball arena on the University of Arkansas at Little Rock campus.
The Fiscal Session began April 8, 2020 and concluded April 24.

Major events

Vacancies
Representative John Walker (D-34th) died on October 28, 2019. The Democratic primary to fill the seat was held January 14, resulting in a runoff between Joy Springer and Ryan Davis. The runoff appeared to end in a tie until a ballot arrived from Sweden, giving Springer the one-vote win. She defeated independent candidate Roderick Talley on March 3 and was sworn March 18, 2020 to fill the seat for the remainder of the term.
Representative Mickey Gates (R-22nd) made national news in 2018 for failing to pay taxes for 15 years, but had resisted calls for his resignation. The House voted to expel Gates in October 2019, leaving his seat vacant until a special election. Richard McGrew (R) won a special election on March 3 to fill the seat for remainder of the term. He was sworn in on March 18, 2020.

Legislative summary
The legislature was prolific during the regular session, considering 684 Senate bills and 986 House bills. A total of 1,091 bills become law; Governor Asa Hutchinson did not veto any bills.

The governor's priority, state government reorganization, merged state agencies from 42 to 15 under the Transformation and Efficiency Act of 2019.
Act 182 cuts Arkansas's top individual income tax rate from 6.9 percent to 5.9 percent over two years.

In the special session, both chambers unanimously sent identical COVID-19 relief-related bills enabling the creation of a $173 million COVID-19 Rainy Day Fund from previously unallocated reserves. By the start of the fiscal session, three lawmakers had tested positive for COVID-19. A short fiscal session met to pass an annual budget, revised lower due to lower revenue forecasts, and reauthorized Arkansas Works, Arkansas's Medicaid expansion. Lawmakers and staff were provided with cloth masks sewed by friends and family of Rep. Robin Lundstrum (R-87th).

Lawmakers produced a $5.89 billion general revenue budget in the fiscal session by votes of 35-0 and 98-0 and sent it to the governor on April 16.

Senate

Leadership

Officers

Floor Leaders

Source: Arkansas Senate

Senators

House of Representatives

Leadership

Officers

Floor Leaders

Source: Arkansas House of Representatives

Representatives

References

Arkansas legislative sessions
2019 in Arkansas
2020 in Arkansas
2019 U.S. legislative sessions
2020 U.S. legislative sessions